Jean-Jacques Lafon (born October 5, 1955) is a French singer-songwriter and painter. He remains known for his 1985 one-hit wonder "Le géant de papier", which peaked at No. 6 on the SNEP singles chart and earned a Silver disc. Lafon is also the writer of the 1987 hit "Viens boire un p'tit coup à la maison" for Licence IV, under the pseudonym of Falon.

Discography

Albums
 1988 : Mourir à Toulouse
 1993 : Les Années Caroline
 1996 : Autoportrait
 2010 : Le Jardin de mon père

Singles
 1982 : "Sa différence"
 1984 : "C'est beaucoup mieux comme ça"
 1985 : "Le Géant de papier" – No. 6 in France, Silver
 1986 : "Si t'as besoin de moi, fais-moi signe"
 1986 : "Un Mot pour un autre"
 1987 : "Elle voit"
 1987 : "Le Diable au cœur"
 1988 : "Ne laissez pas le soleil se coucher"
 1988 : "Mourir à Toulouse"
 1990 : "Seulement te dire..."
 1991 : "Les Années Caroline"

References

External links
 Official site

1955 births
French male singers
French pop singers
French singer-songwriters
Living people
French male singer-songwriters